The 2011–12 Ghanaian Premier League (known as the Glo Premier League for sponsorship reasons) season was the 53rd season of top-tier football in Ghana. The competition began on 5 September 2011, and ended on 27 May 2012.

Teams and venues
As of 2011–2012 Season, Glo Premier League Clubs by Regions

* Population – 2012 census

Team movement
Teams promoted to 2011–12 Glo Premier League
Tema Youth (Tema, Greater Accra Region)
Bechem United (Bechem, Brong-Ahafo Region)
Wassaman United (Tarkwa, Western Region)

Teams relegated to 2012–13 Ghanaian Football Leagues
Bechem United (Bechem, Brong-Ahafo Region)
Tudu Mighty Jets (Accra, Greater Accra Region)
Wassaman United (Tarkwa, Western Region)

Teams relegated following 2010–2011 Glo Premier League season
King Faisal Babes (Kumasi, Ashanti Region)
Real Tamale United (Tamale, Northern Region)
BA Stars (Sunyani, Brong-Ahafo Region)

The following 16 clubs competed in the 2011–2012 Glo Premier League season.
 Glo Premier League's principle of official statistics is that final club succeeds to predecessor club's history & records.
 Glo Premier League Official Club Profiles Page

Stadiums
Primary venues used in the Glo Premier League:

Standings

Top scorers

References

External links
 Season at soccerway.com

Ghana Premier League seasons
Ghanaian Premier League
2011–12 in Ghanaian football